Mario Pokar (born 18 January 1990) is a German professional footballer who plays as a midfielder for RFCU Luxembourg.

External links
 
 

1990 births
Living people
German footballers
SV Sandhausen players
KSV Hessen Kassel players
Eintracht Frankfurt II players
1. FC Kaiserslautern II players
F91 Dudelange players
3. Liga players
2. Bundesliga players
Association football midfielders
People from Usingen
Sportspeople from Darmstadt (region)
Footballers from Hesse
Racing FC Union Luxembourg players
German expatriate footballers
Expatriate footballers in Luxembourg
German expatriate sportspeople in Luxembourg
Luxembourg National Division players